Clackmannanshire East is one of the five wards used to elect members of the Clackmannanshire council. It elects three Councillors.

Councillors

Election Results

2022 Election
2022 Clackmannanshire Council election

2017 Election
2017 Clackmannanshire Council election

2012 Election
2012 Clackmannanshire Council election

2007 Election
2007 Clackmannanshire Council election

References

Wards of Clackmannanshire